{|

{{Infobox ship characteristics
| Hide header = 
| Header caption = (after 1998 refit)<ref name="DNVDimensions">{{cite ship register |register=DNV |id=21462 |shipname=Vessel info: Norwegian Dream"" Dimensions |accessdate=7 April 2008 }}</ref>
| Ship tonnage = *

| Ship displacement = 
| Ship length = 
| Ship beam = 
| Ship height = 
| Ship draught = 
| Ship depth = 
| Ship decks = 10 (passenger accessible)
| Ship deck clearance = 
| Ship ramps = 
| Ship ice class = 
| Ship power = 
| Ship propulsion = 
| Ship speed = 
| Ship capacity = *1,750 passengers (lower berths)
2,156 passengers (all berths)
| Ship crew = 700
| Ship notes = 
}}
|}
MS Dreamward was a cruise ship owned and operated by Star Cruises. She was built in 1992 by the Chantiers de l'Atlantique shipyard in St. Nazaire, France as MS Dreamward for traffic with Norwegian Cruise Line. In 1998 she was lengthened at Lloyd Werft in Bremerhaven, Germany and renamed as Norwegian Dream. In late 2012, she was transferred to the fleet of Star Cruises and renamed SuperStar Gemini.

History

Concept and construction

The Dreamward was the first in a pair of two identical cruise ships ordered by Kloster Cruise for Norwegian Cruise Line (NCL) from Chantiers de l'Atlantique. The sisters were planned with a gross tonnage of approximately 40,000, and maximum passenger capacity of 1,246 persons. However, they were also designed from the start with the concept of lengthening in mind, making it possible for the company to easily expand their capacity without having to order entirely new ships.

The lengthening was eventually carried out in March–May 1998 at Lloyd Werft in Bremerhaven, Germany, where the ship was cut in half and a new  midsection was inserted. In addition to the lengthening, the ship's funnel and radar mast were adapted so that they could be folded down, allowing her to pass under the bridges of the Kiel Canal. Coinciding with the lengthening, Dreamward was renamed Norwegian Dream. A documentary film about the lengthening has been broadcast by ARTE Television on 19 January 1999.

 Service history 

The Dreamward was delivered on 4 November 1992. She was named on 5 December 1992 at Port Everglades, Florida, and started on her first cruise to Bermuda the following day. Subsequently, the ship was used for cruising from New York to the Bahamas and from Florida to the Caribbean. Originally both the Dreamward and Windward carried the early-1990s NCL livery with a white funnel and red and blue decorative stripes on the hull. Some time before 1998 they received the new NCL livery with a dark blue funnel and an all-white hull.

The Dreamward made a brief cameo in David Foster Wallace's 1995 Harper's magazine essay "Shipping Out: On the (nearly lethal) comforts of a luxury cruise", when the ship Wallace was travelling on, the Zenith, docked alongside the Dreamward in Cozumel. Wallace expresses his amazement at the scale of the Dreamward as it docks, and at what he perceives as its relatively impressive appearance compared to the Zenith.

Afterward, she also used for cruising around Europe. On 24 August 1999, the Norwegian Dream was involved in a collision with the container ship  (IMO 9134244) while en route from Zeebrügge, Belgium to Dover, England. Although her bow was damaged, the Norwegian Dream continued to Dover under her own power. The IMO report states that the weather at the time was good with a slight sea and good visibility.  The Ever Decent was severely damaged, eventually listing 40 degrees to port.  As a result of the collision the Ever Decent caught fire and a toxic plume formed.  The cargo her included all IMO hazmat classes except explosives, in particular two containers of cyanide were a concern. Following the incident, the Norwegian Dream was repaired at Lloyd Werft.

In 2004 the ownership of the Norwegian Dream was transferred to NCL's parent company Star Cruises, in preparation for possible sale or transfer to the Star Cruises fleet. On 10 December 2007, the cruise ship was involved in a further collision with a barge while leaving the port of Montevideo, Uruguay. The collision caused some damage above the waterline that did not appear to be serious. The collision caused several cars and five containers to fall off the barge, which closed the port for some time.

On 23 April 2008 Star Cruises entered an agreement to sell the Norwegian Dream, as well as her fleetmate , to the Cyprus-based Louis Cruise Lines, which was reportedly willing to pay $218 million for the ship. International Shipping Partners was also interested in the Norwegian Dream. Louis was supposed to pay the entire $218 million upon the ship's delivery, but by 29 September 2008, when the ship should have been delivered to Louis, they canceled the deal due to "technical issues relating to the vessel." The deal for the Norwegian Majesty, however, was completed in July. In November 2008, the Norwegian Dream was laid up in Freeport, Bahamas awaiting a buyer.. The ship had a brief spell in the port of Piraeus, Greece, before relocating to Kalamata on 13 June 2011 for inspection by Louis Cruise Lines and Pullmantur Cruises. Shortly thereafter, she returned to the anchor point off Piraeus. Later, on the move yet again, Norwegian Dream was sighted at anchor in Singapore Harbour in June 2011. Star Cruises confirmed that the vessel was in Singapore for a technical dry-dock. She was also seen anchored in the harbor in Penang, Malaysia, in May 2012.

On 10 September 2012, Star Cruises announced that it would refurbish Norwegian Dream, and rename the ship to SuperStar Gemini. The refurbished SuperStar Gemini now housed new onboard facilities including restaurants of Chinese, Asian and international cuisines, open-deck barbecue, show lounge, karaoke, spa & health club, beauty salon, children's playroom and swimming pool. With a passenger capacity of 1,532, the vessel houses 766 guest cabins in a variety of layouts including ergonomic oceanview rooms, junior suites and deluxe executive suites. The estimated cost of this refurbishment was US$50 million.

He was reported missing after he failed to respond to the ship's announcements before the ship docked in Georgetown, Penang.

In April 2022, it was announced that SuperStar Gemini along with SuperStar Aquarius and Star Pisces were all sold for scrap, following the collapse of Star Cruises' parent company, Genting Hong Kong. On 29 May 2022 the ship departured from Penang as Gem'' with flag St. Kittis and Nevis for scrap in India.

References

Notes

Bibliography

External links
 SuperStar Gemini
 NCL Website
 Collision photos
 Collision photos

Ships of Norwegian Cruise Line
Ships of Star Cruises
Ships built in France
1992 ships
Ships built by Chantiers de l'Atlantique